The wrinkled toadlet (Uperoleia rugosa) is a species of small, ground-dwelling frog in the family Myobatrachidae It is endemic to Australia. It is also commonly called the small-headed toadlet, red-groined toadlet or the chubby gungan.

Description

The wrinkled toadlet is a small frog, which varies largely in size. The dorsal surface is warty, and grey to brown, with dark markings. The ventral surface is smooth and grey. The parotoid glands and inguinal glands are large in comparison to the size of the frog, and yellowish in colour. Behind each knee, and in the groin are bright orange.

The tadpoles hatch mostly black, with a distinct gold patch behind each eye. As development continues, the gold pigment spreads, until the tadpole is mottled grey and gold.

The wrinkled toadlet has mostly unwebbed hands and feet, and the tympanum is not visible.

Ecology and behavior
The wrinkled toadlet inhabits subtropical or tropical dry shrubland, subtropical or tropical dry lowland grassland and forests, and intermittent freshwater marshes. The males call from within flooded grasslands any time of the year, except winter. The male's call is a high pitched click. Amplexus takes place within the flooded grassland. The male fertilizes each egg individually. The female then dives under water and attaches it to a submerged object. Each egg is attached to a different object.

Notes

References

 

Uperoleia
Amphibians of Queensland
Amphibians of New South Wales
Amphibians of Victoria (Australia)
Amphibians of South Australia
Amphibians described in 1916
Frogs of Australia